SS Peralta is a concrete floating breakwater in Powell River in British Columbia. She was built as a concrete oil tanker by the San Francisco Shipbuilding Company, and was launched in February 1921. The ship is 128 m long, with a beam of 15.4 m and has a volume of 6,144 GRT. She was acquired in 1924 and converted into a sardine cannery in Alaska. After spending 24 years in this role the ship was moored off Antioch, California. She was bought by Macmillan Bloedel in 1958 and moored as part of a giant floating breakwater in Powell River to protect the company's log storage pond. She is the oldest and largest American-built concrete ship still afloat.

With the downsizing of operations at the pulp mill in late 2000, it was proposed to sink the Peralta as an artificial reef, but this was later rejected.

References

 at concreteships.org
Powell River's giant hulks

Design 1100 tankers
Concrete ships
Ships built in Oakland, California
1921 ships
Oil tankers
Ships sunk as breakwaters